Three Top Mountain (variant names: Three Tops) is a mountain in the North Carolina High Country, located west of the town of West Jefferson.  Its elevation reaches  at its highest peak, unofficially named "Big Rock." Three Top also has ten other sub-peaks of varying height.

The mountain generates feeder streams to the North Fork New River.

References

Mountains of North Carolina
Mountains of Ashe County, North Carolina